Major General Yousef Huneiti is the current Chairman of the Joint Chiefs of Staff of the Jordanian Armed Forces. Huneiti was appointed to this position on 24 July 2019. Huneiti is the first Jordanian Air Force commander to be appointed Chief of the Armed Forces.

Career
He was part of the Jordanian Air Force at King Hussein Air Base in 1978, then at Prince Hassan Air Base in 1981, and H-4 Air Base in 1982. In 1983, he became a fighting pilot, and in 1989, he became a trainer.

In 2003, he served as the Head of the Operations and Plans Division, then as the Commander of the Aviation at Muwaffaq Salti Air Base in 2008–2010, and as the Commander of King Hussein Air College in 2010–2012.

He later became a supervisor of air training operations in general in Jordan in 2012, after which he was promoted to be the Director of Air Operations in the period (2013–2015), then he reached the position of Assistant Commander of the Royal Air Force for Operations and Air Defense on July 9, 2015, then Commander of the Royal Air Force On 22 December 2016, he remained in this position until he was appointed Chairman of the Joint Chiefs of Staff, the highest military position in Jordan on 24 July 2019.

Personal life
He is married and has five daughters and one son.

References

Living people
Jordanian generals
1959 births
People from Amman